The lowfin gulper shark (Centrophorus lusitanicus) is a large deepwater dogfish in the family Centrophoridae.

Physical characteristics
The lowfin gulper shark has no anal fin, two dorsal fins (with spines with the first dorsabeing much longer than the rear), a long, broad snout, and angular pectoral fins. Its maximum length is 1.6 m.

Distribution
The lowfin gulper shark is found in the Eastern Atlantic off Portugal and West Africa, the Indian Ocean around Mozambique and Madagascar, and the West Pacific by Taiwan.

Habits and habitat
Lowfin gulper sharks live at depths between 300 and 1,400 m. They are ovoviviparous and give birth to up to six pups per litter. They feed on other sharks, bony fish, crabs, and lobsters.

References

External link

lowfin gulper shark
Fish of Madagascar
Fish of Mozambique
Fauna of Portugal
Fauna of the Canary Islands
Fish of West Africa
lowfin gulper shark
Taxobox binomials not recognized by IUCN